This is a list of LA Galaxy's matches in international soccer competitions. The LA Galaxy have participated in numerous international tournaments, both competitive and non-competitive. Their most successful international club title came in 2000, when the Galaxy won the CONCACAF Champions' Cup.

FIFA Club World Cup

CONCACAF Champions League 

The competition was known as the CONCACAF Champions' Cup prior to 2008.

North American SuperLiga & Leagues Cup

Friendly tournaments

International Champions Cup

La Manga Cup

Pan-Pacific Championship

Peace Cup

World Football Challenge

Overall record 

Legend: GF = Goals For. GA = Goals Against. GD = Goal Difference.

Notes

References

External links 
 LA Galaxy

International
American soccer clubs records and statistics
La Galaxy